Möhlau is a village and a former municipality in Wittenberg district in Saxony-Anhalt, Germany. Since 1 January 2011, it is part of the town Gräfenhainichen. It was part of the administrative community (Verwaltungsgemeinschaft) of Tor zur Dübener Heide.

Geography
The community lies on the southern edge of Wittenberg district about 9 km west of the former district seat of Gräfenhainichen and about 18 km southeast of Dessau, right on the border with Saxony.

Geology
The municipal area is strongly marked by brown coal strip mining. Most of the old pits have flooded since they were shut down and are now used as bathing ponds.

Subdivisions
Möhlau consists of the subdivisions of Golpa, Rothehaus, Großmöhlau, and Kleinmöhlau.

History
Möhlau is said to have been settled originally by Slavs. It had its first documentary mention on 12 December 1200 when a church was consecrated in Wörlitz, about 25 km away.

References

Former municipalities in Saxony-Anhalt
Gräfenhainichen